Obscuro Barroco is a documentary film, directed by Evangelia Kranioti and released in 2018. A Greek and French coproduction, the film profiles Luana Muniz, a Brazilian transgender activist.

Summary
Obscuro Barroco is an object that transforms infinitely, that devours infinitely: it is the mouth of Luana Muniz, a legendary figure of Rio de Janeiro’s night that serves as the stolen point of entry to the city's nocturnal incandescence.
The film opens with a seductive ballet of luxuriant tropical vegetation caught in the sea breeze and bowing under heavy rain drops. The theatrical beauty of these evergreen trees is so intense that it appears to border upon the artificial: these images set the stage for a reversal of perspective in which nature itself seems factitious. It will reappear in the glittering décor of a carnival float, the swirling gateway to an artificial paradise that a healer blows in our face. It is our very capacity for metempsychosis that plays out in this film, this strange and unknown faculty through which our soul can move towards, through and inside other bodies. A true question of cinema, then.

Obscuro Barroco is a docufiction about the dizzying heights of gender and metamorphosis. It is also a cinematographic hommage to a land of extremes, the city of Rio de Janeiro. Following the path of iconic transsexual figure Luana Muniz (1961-2017), the film explores different quests for the self through transvestism, carnaval and political struggle. In turn, it asks questions about the desire for transformation of the body, both intimate and social.

The film had its theatrical premiere at the 2018 Berlin International Film Festival, where it won a Jury Award from the Teddy Award program.

References

External links
 

2018 films
2018 documentary films
Greek documentary films
Greek LGBT-related films
French documentary films
French LGBT-related films
Portuguese-language films
Transgender-related documentary films
2018 LGBT-related films
2010s French films